The 2002 NCAA Division II women's basketball tournament was the 21st annual tournament hosted by the NCAA to determine the national champion of Division II women's  collegiate basketball in the United States.

Defending champions Cal Poly Pomona defeated Southeastern Oklahoma State in the championship game, 74–62, to claim the Broncos' fifth overall and second consecutive NCAA Division II national title.

As in 2001, the championship rounds were contested at the Mayo Civic Center in Rochester, Minnesota.

Regionals

East - Glenville, West Virginia
Location: Jesse Lilly Gym Host: Glenville State College

Great Lakes - Evansville, Indiana
Location: Physical Activities Center Host: University of Southern Indiana

North Central - Grand Junction, Colorado
Location: Brownson Arena Host: Mesa State College

Northeast - Springfield, Massachusetts
Location: Henry A. Butova Gym Host: American International College

South - Cleveland, Mississippi
Location: Walter Sillers Coliseum Host: Delta State University

South Atlantic - Mars Hill, North Carolina
Location: Stanford Arena Host: Mars Hill College

South Central - St. Joseph, Missouri
Location: MWSC Fieldhouse Host: Missouri Western State College

West - Pomona, California
Location: Kellogg Gym Host: California State Polytechnic University, Pomona

Elite Eight - Rochester, Minnesota
Location: Mayo Civic Center Host: Winona State University

All-tournament team
 Lauri McIntosh, Cal Poly Pomona
 Aprile Powell, Cal Poly Pomona
 Brandi Robinson, Southeastern Oklahoma
 Amanda Mortlette, Glenville State
 Tracy Wyatt, Glenville State

See also
 2002 NCAA Division I women's basketball tournament
 2002 NCAA Division III women's basketball tournament
 2002 NAIA Division I women's basketball tournament
 2002 NAIA Division II women's basketball tournament
 2002 NCAA Division II men's basketball tournament

References
 2002 NCAA Division II women's basketball tournament jonfmorse.com

 
NCAA Division II women's basketball tournament
2002 in sports in Minnesota